Sphingomonas japonica  is a bacterium from the genus of Sphingomonas which has been isolated from the crab Paralithodes camtschaticus in the Peter the Great Bay in Russia.

References

Further reading

External links
Type strain of Sphingomonas japonica at BacDive -  the Bacterial Diversity Metadatabase	

japonica
Bacteria described in 2009